Virgin Territory is an American reality television series that follows the real-life stories of 15 young adults from across the country as they navigate the complexities of relationships and one of the most complicated and emotional decisions of their young adult lives: whether to have sex or remain a virgin. Each episode lasts one hour and explores four different cast members from all walks of life. The series a premiered on MTV in July 2014.

The cast

The girls

The boys

Episodes

References

External links
 Official website

MTV original programming
2010s American reality television series
2014 American television series debuts
English-language television shows